Nacimiento is a municipality of Almería province, in the autonomous community of Andalusia, Spain.

Demographics

References

External links
 Nacimiento - Sistema de Información Multiterritorial de Andalucía  
 Nacimiento - Diputación Provincial de Almería  
 Nacimiento - Información de Nacimiento por Angel Mateo 

Municipalities in the Province of Almería